Joseph Douglas Moeller (born February 15, 1943 in Blue Island, Illinois) is a former pitcher in Major League Baseball who played for the Los Angeles Dodgers from 1962 to 1971. Moeller is the youngest starting pitcher in Dodgers history at 19 years, 2 months of age. He pitched two innings in the 1966 World Series against the Baltimore Orioles.

Moeller has worked as the Advance Scout for the Miami Marlins since 2002, including their 2003 World Series championship season.

Early life
Moeller attended Mira Costa High School.

References

Joe Moeller has the Los Angeles Dodgers record at 19 years, two months

External links

1943 births
Living people
Major League Baseball pitchers
Los Angeles Dodgers players
Los Angeles Dodgers Legend Bureau
Baseball players from Illinois
People from Blue Island, Illinois
Reno Silver Sox players
Greenville Spinners players
Spokane Indians players
Arizona Instructional League Dodgers players
Hawaii Islanders players
Eugene Emeralds players
Miami Marlins scouts
Montreal Expos scouts
Cleveland Indians coaches
Omaha Dodgers players
Mira Costa High School alumni